Open the Door may refer to:

 Open the Door (Roger Hodgson album), 2000
 "Open the Door", the album's title track
 Open the Door (Pentangle album), 1985
 "Open the Door", the album's title track
 "Open the Door" (Betty Carter song)
 "Open the Door" (Magnapop song)
 "Open the Door", a song by Die Antwoord
 "Open the Door", a song by Bad Gyal and Govana featuring DJ Papis 
 "Open the Door", a song by James Booker
 "Open the Door", a song by Im Chang-jung
 "Open the Door", a song by Sugababes from Change
 "Open the Door", a song by Zion I and The Grouch from Heroes in the City of Dope
 "Open the Door (To Your Heart)", a song by Van Morrison from Born to Sing: No Plan B
 "Song for Judith (Open the Door)", a song by Judy Collins

See also
Open the Door - Live at Mietta's, a 1992 collaborative live jazz album by Jex Saarelaht and Kate Ceberano
"Open the Door, Richard", a 1954 song first recorded by Jack McVea
Open the door see mountain, a Chinglish expression
"Let My Love Open the Door", a 1980 Pete Townshend song
The Open Door, an album by the American rock band Evanescence